Gerry Harvey (born 18 September 1939) is an Australian entrepreneur best known for being the executive chairman of Harvey Norman Holdings, a company which runs Australian retail chain Harvey Norman. He co-founded it with Ian Norman in 1982.

Biography
Harvey was born in rural New South Wales and attended school at Bathurst and Katoomba before moving to Sydney to go to university when he was 17, but he dropped out. He got his start early, selling vacuum cleaners and fridges door-to-door for Goodwins of Newtown. When he was younger, Harvey was determined to be a farmer.

Harvey first met Ian Norman while both were working as door-to-door vacuum salesmen. They partnered to open their first store in Sydney in 1961. The chain, which was called Norman Ross, expanded to forty-two stores with annual sales of 240 million by 1979. This company was sold in 1982 to firstly Grace Bros. for $23 million, then was onsold to Alan Bond's Walton Bond company. After that transaction was completed, Harvey was sacked via order from Alan Bond by John Walton. This action was spoken about in Harvey's first ad for his next venture. Harvey, with Ian Norman as a silent partner, started Harvey Norman that same year through its first store in Auburn, NSW. It then expanded and now owns the retailers Domayne, and Joyce Mayne, along with numerous other, smaller businesses. Harvey adopts a very hands-on approach to his business, appearing as a spokesman during radio adverts for Harvey Norman. He frequently gives comment on economic and business matters in the national press and television media and has a sizeable public profile. He is generally regarded as a slightly maverick businessman and is often critical of Australian CEOs, particularly when it comes to remuneration. He often states that no one is worth the millions they earn and that if they think they are worth more, they can be paid in options and shares.

In January 2011, Harvey was embroiled in a widely-condemned campaign, backed by a number of brick-and-mortar Australian retailers, to scrap tax rules that allowed Australians to shop on overseas websites without paying GST. In response to the campaign, the Federal Government asked the Productivity Commission to investigate and report on the retail industry. Harvey subsequently said the report was a waste of time and money, and that he did not read it.

Thoroughbred business interests
Over the last decade he has become increasingly involved with breeding race horses, and he owns Baramul Stud. Harvey has one of the world's largest thoroughbred portfolio, with over 600 thoroughbreds in his stables. He also owns 50% of Magic Millions, one of the largest and most expensive thoroughbred auction events in the Australian racing industry.

Personal life
Harvey has two children with his first wife, Lynette. He remarried to Katie Page in 1988; they have two children. In 1999, Page became the CEO of Harvey Norman.

In an interview in 2008, he described giving charity to the homeless as "a waste", and said that it was "helping a whole heap of no-hopers to survive for no good reason". He later claimed the comments were taken out of context and he did give money to homeless charities, among others.

In 2016, Harvey expressed contempt for what he saw as political uncertainty since John Howard left office, and said the only solution is "to have a dictator like in China".

Net worth 
In 2014, the Business Review Weekly (BRW) assessed Harvey's net worth at 1.55 billion; an increase of 9 million on the 2013 BRW Rich 200 list. From 2013 up to and including 2020, the BRW/Financial Review assessed Harvey's wealth as an individual. From 2021, the Financial Review assessed the combined net worth of Harvey and Page jointly.

Notes 
 : 20132020 = BRW/Financial Review assessed the net worth of Harvey only
 : Since 2021 = Financial Review assessed the combined net worth of Harvey and Page jointly

References

External links

1939 births
Living people
Australian chairpersons of corporations
Australian businesspeople in retailing
Australian billionaires
Australian company founders
Retail company founders
People from Katoomba, New South Wales